The Four Broncos Memorial Trophy is awarded each year to the Western Hockey League's Player of the Year.

The trophy is named in honour of four members of the Swift Current Broncos who were killed on December 30, 1986 in the Swift Current Broncos bus crash: Trent Kresse, Scott Kruger, Chris Mantyka, and Brent Ruff. The accident that occurred as the team bus was en route to a game in Regina.

Winners

Blue background denotes also named CHL Player of the Year
1The WHL handed out separate awards for the East and West divisions.

See also
CHL Player of the Year
Red Tilson Trophy - Ontario Hockey League Player of the Year
Michel Brière Memorial Trophy - Quebec Major Junior Hockey League Player of the Year

References

Western Hockey League trophies and awards